Mary Lou Zelazny (born 1956, Chicago, Illinois, USA) is an American painter. Educated at the School of the Art Institute of Chicago (SAIC) where she was exposed to and trained with Ray Yoshida, Barbara Rossi, Hollis Sigler and others of that generation. Completed Bachelor of Fine Art degree in 1980.

Art career
Zelazny began her solo exhibition career at the Peter Miller Gallery Chicago in 1984, and through the years has had solo exhibitions with the Roy Boyd Gallery Chicago, Phyllis Kind Gallery (Chicago and New York City), and is currently represented by the Carl Hammer Gallery in Chicago. The Hyde Park Art Center Chicago held a major retrospective of her work in 2009. Her painting "Sea Walker" was exhibited in the Museum of Contemporary Art Chicago show, Surrealism: The Conjured Life (Nov 2015-June 2016).

Known for her collage and paint works on canvas. Zelazny is Adjunct Professor in the Department of Painting and Drawing at the SAIC. Her painting, "Made of Iron" was featured on the cover of the literary and art journal "Mission at Tenth" in 2014 

In addition to painting and teaching, she performed the role of "Ida Blue" in the 2012 animated film Consuming Spirits by Chris Sullivan.

Public collections
 City of Chicago Public Art Collection: 19th District Chicago Police Department
 Elmhurst College Art Collection, Elmhurst, Illinois
 First Chicago Bank, Chicago
 Kemper National Insurance Companies
 The Museum of Contemporary Art, Chicago
 Nagin and Associates, Miami, FL
 Prudential Insurance Company, Newark, NJ
 Rockford Art Museum, Rockford, IL
 The Elmhurst Art Museum, Elmhurst, IL
 Weichman and Associates, Munster, IN

References

External links
 Official website
 SAIC Biography
 YouTube - The Artist in Your Backyard: Mary Lou Zelazny
 Chicago’s Own Surrealist: Mary Lou Zelazny
 Altogether Mutable: The work of Mary Lou Zelazny
 

1956 births
Living people
American women painters
School of the Art Institute of Chicago alumni
20th-century American painters
21st-century American painters
20th-century American women artists
21st-century American women artists
Artists from Chicago